HMS Northumberland was a 70-gun third rate ship of the line of the Royal Navy, built at Plymouth Dockyard to the draught specified by the 1745 Establishment, and launched on 1 December 1750.

During the Seven Years' War Northumberland was the flagship of Lord Alexander Collville from 1753 to 1762, and under the captaincy of William Adams until 1760 and Nathaniel Bateman from 1760 to 1762. Future explorer James Cook served as ship's master from 1759 to 1761.

Northumberland was later classified as a storeship and was renamed Leviathan on 13 September 1777. She foundered on 27 February 1780 whilst sailing from Jamaica to Britain.

Notes

References

 
 Lavery, Brian (2003) The Ship of the Line – Volume 1: The development of the battlefleet 1650–1850. Conway Maritime Press. .
 
 Phillips, Michael. Northumberland (70) (1750). Michael Phillips' Ships of the Old Navy. Retrieved 13 August 2008.
 Winfield, Rif (2007) British Warships in the Age of Sail: 1714–1792. Seaforth Publishing. .

 

Ships of the line of the Royal Navy
1750 ships
Maritime incidents in 1780